Vergil Ortiz Jr. vs. Samuel Vargas was a Welterweight professional boxing match contested between the defending WBA Gold champion the American Vergil Ortiz Jr. and the Canadian-Colombian Samuel Vargas. The event originally scheduled for Ortiz Jr. vs Vargas on 28 March 2020 at The Forum, Inglewood, California and the unified super middleweight world titles between the current four-division champion, the Mexican Canelo Álvarez vs. the WBO champion, the British Billy Joe Saunders on 2 May 2020 at the T-Mobile Arena in Las Vegas, Nevada. But the Canelo vs. Saunders fight has been cancelled and replaced by the Ortiz Jr. vs Vargas fight in 24 July at the Fantasy Springs Resort Casino, Indio, California due to the COVID-19 pandemic.

Fight card

Broadcaster 
The event will mark the OTT Streaming service DAZN launch globally in Latin America (after previously been launched in Brazil a year ago), UK, and other 189 countries after previously been launched in nine countries.

References 

Boxing matches
2020 in boxing
Golden Boy Promotions
2020 in sports in California
July 2020 sports events in the United States